Jovan Ilić Deretić (18 January 1939 – 6 June 2021) was a Serbian publicist and writer. Deretić was an engineer by training but was mainly noted for his pseudohistorical and conspiracy theories. He was the proponent of an alternative history of the Serbs that asserts a larger role in history than described by historians.

Personal life and biography 
According to Deretić, prior to the conquests of Alexander the Great, there lived an even more-accomplished conqueror named Serbon Makeridov, who was "father of all nations" and that "all of his descendants, or rather all known peoples, have Serbian origin". Ancient peoples such as ancient Greeks, Etruscans and Celts are therefore claimed to be Serbian. Deretić asserted that existing historical research is evidence for these theories but his interpretations have been criticized by other historians.

Deretić died on 6 June 2021 at the age of 82.

Political activity 
Deretić organized a petition drive of Kosovo Serbs requesting Russian citizenship: "Ethnic Serbs in Kosovo would feel more protected, if Russia granted them citizenship." According to Deretić, Kosovo Serbs felt abandoned by the Serbian government after the Kumanovo Agreement ended the Kosovo War and they were attacked by the Kosovo Force: "NATO peacekeepers attacked unarmed Serbs in Kosovska Mitrovica, and ethnic cleansing is taking place in Kosovo where many Serbs were killed, disappeared or exiled." Deretić said he gathered 72,500 signatures from Kosovo Serbs who wanted to adopt Russia as "a second Serbia" that would protect them against anti-Serb violence.

Works 

History of Serbs, I, Nice
History of Serbs, II, Nice
Western Serbia, Chicago
Serb people and race, New Vulgate, Chicago, 
Albanians in Serbia
Ancient Serbia
Serbs and Albanians, 
Our Victory
Invented immigration of Serbs, 
Serbica
Literacy before Cyril
History of the Serbs and Russians, I
History of the Serbs and Russians, II
History of the Serbs and Russians, III
Paul's Cave

References

External links 
 

1939 births
2021 deaths
People from Trebinje
Serbs of Bosnia and Herzegovina
Pseudohistorians
Historians of antiquity
20th-century Serbian historians
Serbian nationalists
Serbian conspiracy theorists